is a former Japanese football player and manager. He played for Japan national team. He also managed Japan national team as caretaker.

Club career
Hara was born in Nasushiobara on October 19, 1958. After graduating from Waseda University, he joined Mitsubishi Motors (later Urawa Reds) in 1981 as a forward. The club won 1981 JSL Cup and 1982 Japan Soccer League. He played as a regular player from first season and played in all matches in the league until 1988. After that, club performance was not good, he also played in Division 2. He retired in 1992. He played 192 games and scored 65 goals in the league.

National team career
On November 19, 1978, when Hara was a Waseda University student, he debuted for Japan national team against Soviet Union. He also played at 1978 Asian Games and 1982 World Cup qualification in 1980. From 1981, he played most matches of Japan national team until 1988. He played 75 games and scored 37 goals for Japan until 1987. He was known for his headers and was aptly nicknamed the "Asian Nuclear Warhead".

Coaching career

Urawa Reds
Hara retired from playing career in 1992 and began his new career as the coach of the youth team of his old club, which had been renamed by this point as Urawa Reds. In 1998 Hara became the manager of Urawa's top squad. Initially he saw success, with the team achieving a 3rd place finish for J.League's second stage in 1998. However, during J.League's first stage of 1999, the team finished 13th in the standings and Hara was released.

Following his release from Urawa, Hara travelled to Spain to study the coaching methods applied by several La Liga clubs. Upon returning to Japan, he spent two years working as a commentator for Sky PerfecTV!.

FC Tokyo
In 2002 Hara decided to return to coaching as the manager of FC Tokyo. He brought youngsters such as Naohiro Ishikawa, Teruyuki Moniwa and Akira Kaji, introduced Spanish-style tactics into the young and fresh team, and won J.League Cup in 2004. Hara was released from his position as manager of the club in 2005. However in 2007 he was re-appointed as the club's manager, but was again released only after one season.

Japan national team
On 12 February 2009, Hara was appointed by Japan Football Association as its new technical director for the Japan national team, responsible for strengthening the national team. After fellow Waseda alumnus Takeshi Okada stepped down after leading Japan to a lauded performance at the 2010 World Cup, Hara was given the responsibility for finding his replacement, which was revealed in late August after protracted negotiations in Europe to be the Italian manager Alberto Zaccheroni. He also took charge in a caretaker capacity for the friendlies against Paraguay, leading Japan to a 1-0 win, and Guatemala, both of which were held at his former hunting ground in Saitama Stadium 2002.

Club statistics

National team statistics

Managerial statistics

References

External links
 
 Japan National Football Team Database

1958 births
Living people
Waseda University alumni
Association football people from Tochigi Prefecture
Japanese footballers
Japan international footballers
Japan Soccer League players
Urawa Red Diamonds players
Japanese football managers
J1 League managers
Urawa Red Diamonds managers
FC Tokyo managers
Japan national football team managers
Footballers at the 1978 Asian Games
Footballers at the 1982 Asian Games
Footballers at the 1986 Asian Games
Association football forwards
Asian Games competitors for Japan